Dimitar Manolov (1901 – 1979) was a Bulgarian footballer. He played in eight matches for the Bulgaria national football team from 1924 to 1929. He was also part of Bulgaria's squad for the football tournament at the 1924 Summer Olympics, but he did not play in any matches.

References

External links
 

1901 births
1979 deaths
Bulgarian footballers
Bulgaria international footballers
Association football midfielders
Footballers from Sofia
PFC Slavia Sofia players